The Puertollano Photovoltaic Park is the fourth largest photovoltaic power station in the world, with a nominal capacity of 47.6 MW. The facility is located in Puertollano, Spain. 476 individual plants with a nominal power of 100 kWp, Suntech and Solaria modules. Fixed structure oriented at 33° south with a total of 231,653 panels.

See also 

 List of largest power stations in the world
 List of photovoltaic power stations
 List of power stations in Spain

References 

Photovoltaic power stations in Spain
Energy in Castilla–La Mancha